The 17641 / 42 Kacheguda - Narkhed Intercity Express is an Express  train belonging to Indian Railways South Central Railway zone that runs between  and Narkhed in India.

Coaches
The 17641 / 42 Kacheguda - Narkhed Intercity Express has one AC Chair Car,  four Non AC chair car, 12 general unreserved & two SLR (seating with luggage rake) coaches . It does not carry a pantry car coach.

As is customary with most train services in India, coach composition may be amended at the discretion of Indian Railways depending on demand.

Service

Routing

Traction
As the route is going to be electrified, a   based WCAM-3 Electric locomotive pulls the train to its destination.

References

External links
17641 Intercity Express at India Rail Info
17642 Intercity Express at India Rail Info

Intercity Express (Indian Railways) trains
Transport in Hyderabad, India
Rail transport in Telangana
Rail transport in Maharashtra